Eastsideridaz is an album by rapper, Goldie Loc, released in 2007. It also featured guest appearances from his partners of the group The Warzone, MC Eiht and Kam plus other West Coast acts like Kokane and Nate Dogg.

Track listing
Intro
Burn 'Em Up
Gettin' Bread
Drinkin' Straight
Hurt Something
Hustle In My Veins (featuring The Warzone)
I Got a Bottle
My Place
Hatin' on Me
Right Now
When I Ain't Around (featuring The Warzone & Nate Dogg)
I'ma Tell Yo' Mama
Run a Train
Keep It Hood (featuring Kokane)
Pancake Rip

Goldie Loc albums
2007 albums